Yevgeni Vasilyevich Aleinikov (born May 29, 1967 in Ordzhonikidze, Ukraine) is a Russian sport shooter, specializing in the rifles event. He won the bronze medal at the  2000 Olympic Games in the 10 metre air rifle event. He also competed at 1996.

Olympic results

External links
Profile on issfnews.com

1967 births
Living people
Sportspeople from Vladikavkaz
Soviet male sport shooters
Russian male sport shooters
ISSF rifle shooters
Olympic shooters of Russia
Shooters at the 1996 Summer Olympics
Shooters at the 2000 Summer Olympics
Olympic bronze medalists for Russia
Olympic medalists in shooting
Medalists at the 2000 Summer Olympics